Below is a list of modern-day Greek language exonyms for mostly European places outside of Greece and Cyprus. Place names that are not mentioned are generally referred to in Greek by their respective names in their native languages, or with the closest pronunciation in Greek.

Afghanistan

Albania

Algeria

Artsakh

Australia

Austria

Belarus

Belgium

Brazil

Bulgaria

Canada

China

Croatia

Czechia

Denmark

Egypt

France

Georgia

Germany

Guatemala

Hungary

India

Iran

Iraq

Ireland

Israel

Italy

Jordan

Lebanon

Libya

Luxembourg

Mexico

Moldova

Montenegro

Morocco

Netherlands

North Macedonia

Poland

Portugal

Romania

Russia

Serbia

Spain

Sweden

Switzerland

Turkey
Turkey formerly had a large Greek-speaking population, and parts of what is now Turkey used to be part of Greece.

Ukraine

United Kingdom

United States

See also
 List of European exonyms
 List of traditional Greek place names

Greek language
Lists of exonyms